Andrzej Jerzy Buras (born 26 October 1946 in Warsaw, Poland) is a Polish-born Danish theoretical physicist, professor emeritus at the Technical University Munich (TUM).

Scientific career
He received his master's degree in theoretical physics at the Warsaw University in 1971, and emigrated to Denmark in the same year. One year later, he received his PhD at the Niels Bohr Institute in Copenhagen. He then worked as a post-doctoral fellow at the Niels Bohr Institute until 1975. After a fellowship in the CERN theory group from 1975–1977 he was first a visitor and then a staff member in the Fermilab theory group from 1977 till 1982. He then became staff member of the Max Planck Institute for Physics in Munich (1982–1988). In 1988 finally he was appointed full professor in the Physics Department of the TUM. After his retirement in 2012 he moved to the TUM Institute for Advanced Study where he is leading the focus group 'Fundamental Physics'.

Buras is known for his early work on strong-interaction effects (QCD) in deep-inelastic electron-proton and neutrino-proton scattering (1977–1980), which led to the commonly used MS-bar scheme for QCD calculations. But his most important contributions (1983-now) are in the field of weak decays of mesons; these include high order calculations of QCD effects in most important decays, the phenomenology of CP violation and of quark flavour physics in the Standard Model and in several New Physics models.

Awards
 2020: Max Planck Medal
 2012: TUM Emeritus of Excellence
 2010: European Research Council Advanced Grant (2011–2016)
 2010: Erwin Schrödinger Visiting Professorship, University of Vienna
 2008–2011: Carl von Linde Senior Fellowship at the TUM Institute for Advanced Study
 2007: Smoluchowski-Warburg Medal of the German and Polish Physical Societies
 2004: Distinguished Lecturer of the Alberta University
 Foreign member of the Polish Academy of Sciences (Warsaw, Poland)
 Foreign member of the Polish Academy of Arts and Sciences (Cracow, Poland)
 Ordinary Member of the Bavarian Academy of Sciences and Humanities (Munich)

References

External links
 Scientific publications of Andrzej J. Buras on INSPIRE-HEP

1946 births
Living people
20th-century Polish physicists
Scientists from Warsaw
Academic staff of the Technical University of Munich
Theoretical physicists
University of Warsaw alumni
People associated with CERN
Winners of the Max Planck Medal
21st-century German physicists